Ostankino Tower is a television and radio tower in Moscow, Russia, owned by the Moscow branch of unitary enterprise Russian TV and Radio Broadcasting Network. Standing , it was designed by Nikolai Nikitin, Pyotr Gorchakov and Yuri Kondratyuk. , it is the tallest free-standing structure in Europe and 12th tallest in the world. Between 1967 and 1974, it was the tallest in the world. The tower was the first free-standing structure to exceed  in height. Ostankino was built to mark the 50th anniversary of the October Revolution. It is named after the surrounding Ostankino district of Moscow.

History

Construction and record holder
Construction began in 1963 and was completed in 1967. Extensive use of prestressed concrete resulted in a simple and sturdy structure. It surpassed the Empire State Building to become the tallest free-standing structure in the world.

Height increase plan
However, this plan to reclaim the "tallest free-standing structure in the world" was not implemented due to lack of funding.

Reopening and recent activity
In April 2009, the observation platform reopened, and the Seventh Heaven restaurant reopened in November 2016.

On 21 July 2018, there was a race up the tower, featuring athletes from 12 countries. They ran up the narrow, spiral staircase and reached the location at an altitude of 337.0 meters. The fastest of the 28 athletes was German, Christian Riedl, who made it to the top in 9 minutes and 51 seconds. The women's winner was Cynthia Harris (USA), who reached the top in 12 minutes and 15 seconds. Absolute records were then broken into the categories of men and women.

Accidents
Over the course of its 21st century history, there have been accidents at the tower, including a fire in 2000, the tower struck by a parachutist in 2004, and a minor fire in 2007.

August 2000 fire

The tower caught fire on 27 August 2000, killing three people. A firefighter and lift operator died when their elevator cabin crashed to the ground level due to the fire. In addition, television and radio signals were disrupted around Moscow. The fire forced the evacuation of all visitors and staff from those locations. According to Russian news agencies, the evacuation was complete 90 minutes after the start of the fire. The loss was substantial due to the age and poor maintenance of the electronic equipment, much of which was installed in the 1960s. In addition, the tower had become increasingly packed with equipment.

The failure of the fire suppression systems allowed the fire to destroy most of the tower's interior. Although more than 300 firefighters and other emergency workers were called in, firemen were forced to haul heavy equipment, including chemical fire extinguishers, by hand up the tower to halt the fire. Temporary firewalls of asbestos placed  up stopped further spread. The fire knocked out virtually all television broadcasts in Moscow and the surrounding regions. The only television station unaffected was the private NTV station, but the government decreed that state channels took priority, and as such, the RTR TV channel began transmitting to several Moscow districts.

The fire caused the tower's upper spire to tilt slightly, triggering fears the tower might collapse. The subsequent inspection determined that although the structure sustained heavy damage, the tower was not in danger of collapse. Efforts began immediately to rebuild the tower, which proved to be a long and expensive task.

The fire was the third disaster in Russia in a month, following an explosion in Moscow's Pushkinskaya Metro Station (which killed 12 people and injured 150), and the sinking of the submarine Kursk in the Barents Sea, in which 118 died. Russian President Vladimir Putin stated that "This latest accident shows the shape of our vital installations and the overall state of our country. We should not fail to see major problems in the country behind this accident, and we should not forget the economy. Whether or not such accidents happen again in the future will depend on how we work in this vital direction."

On 25 March 2005, the first new elevators since the August 2000 fire, made by the German company ThyssenKrupp, were tested and put into service. The new elevators travel at a speed of

2004 base jumping accident 
On 1 July 2004, Austrian BASE jumper Christina Grubelnik struck the tower during her descent, receiving a concussion and losing consciousness.  Her parachute snagged on a lower-level service platform and she was rescued by Russian emergency services.

2007 fire
On 25 May 2007, the Ostankino again caught fire, though it was less serious this time and isolated to a platform on the outside of the tower. All people inside the tower were evacuated and the fire was successfully extinguished, with no casualties.

Channels listed by frequency

Analogue radio (FM)

Digital television (DVB-T2)

Analogue television
In Moscow and the Moscow Region, along with 18 other regions, analogue television closed on 15 April 2019, at 12:00 (UTC+3).

See also
Ostankino Technical Center
List of tallest buildings and structures in the world
List of tallest structures in the former Soviet Union
List of towers
Fernsehturm Stuttgart – first TV tower built from concrete and prototype for many similar towers built later

References

External links

Ostankino Television Tower
A visit to the Ostankino Television Tower at redpenguin.net
BBC: Moscow's TV tower saved

Ostankino Tower Above the Clouds at EnglishRussia.com
Ostankino Tele Tower at Skyscraperpage.com
Building Tallest Tower at EnglishRussia.com

Towers completed in 1967
Buildings and structures in Moscow
Towers built in the Soviet Union
Communication towers in Russia
Towers with revolving restaurants
Tourist attractions in Moscow
Towers in Moscow
Radio masts and towers in Europe
Observation towers
1967 establishments in Russia